Thomas Francis may refer to:

Thomas Francis (MP), English Member of Parliament for Colchester (UK Parliament constituency), 1386–1413
Thomas Francis (English physician) (died 1574), English physician, President of the Royal College of Physicians
Thomas Francis, Prince of Carignano (1596–1656), Italian general
Thomas Willing Francis (1767–1815), American merchant
Thomas Francis Jr. (1900–1969), American physician, virologist, and epidemiologist
Thomas Francis (cricketer) (1902–1969), South African cricketer

Tomas Francis (born 1992), Welsh rugby union player

See also

Francis Thomas (disambiguation)